Friedhelm Christoph Hummel (born 1969 in Laichingen, Germany) is a German neuroscientist and neurologist. A full professor at École Polytechnique Fédérale de Lausanne, he is the Defitech Chair of Clinical Neuroengineering, and the head of the Hummel Laboratory at EPFL's School of Life Sciences. He also is an associate professor of clinical neuroscience at the University of Geneva.

Career 
Hummel studied medicine at University of Tübingen and at Bordeaux Segalen University, graduating in 1998. He then joined the Department of Neurology at the University of Tübingen as a medical resident and researcher. He earned his medical doctor degree in 2000 for his work on Plastische Veränderungen durch semantische klassische Konditionierung und ihre elektrokortikalen Korrelate: eine Studie langsamer Potentiale (Plastic changes through semantic classical conditioning and their electrocortical correlates: a study of slow potentials).

In 2003, he received a Feodor Lynen award from the Alexander von Humboldt Foundation to join Leonardo Cohen's Human Cortical Physiology and Neurorehabilitation Section (NINDS) at the National Institutes of Health (NIH) at Bethesda. There he worked on the first successful application of transcranial direct current stimulation (tDCS) in stroke patients. In 2005, he returned as researcher and medical resident to the Department of Neurology at Tübingen, and, in 2006, to the University Medical Center Hamburg-Eppendorf to finish his residency. In 2006, he founded the Brain Imaging and Neurostimulation (BINS) Laboratory at Hamburg, became a certified  in 2007, co-chairman at the Centre for Sleep Medicine in 2008, senior neurologist in 2013, and vice-director of the Department of neurology in 2013.

Since 2016 he holds the Defitech Chair for Clinical Neuroengineering as full professor, is the director of the Hummel Laboratory at the Centre for Neuroprosthetics (CNP) and the Brain Mind Institute (BMI), both at EPFL. Furthermore, he holds an associate professorship of clinical neuroscience at the University of Geneva.

Research 
Hummel's research targets the fields of systems and translational clinical neuroscience with three main areas of focus. 

The first focus is on using multimodal imaging and behavioral measures to study neuroplasticity, neuronal control of sensorimotor functions, learning, and cognitive functions in healthy and neurological disorders, such as stroke, mild cognitive impairment (MCI) or traumatic brain injury (TBI). 

The second main focus is on developing innovative non-invasive interventional strategies based on neurotechnology, such as brain stimulation to support patients' residual functions and enhance recovery. He has been involved in the application of non-invasive brain stimulation in stroke. 

The third focus is the use of multimodal imaging to predict outcome and course of recovery after a stroke (Koch et al. 2021 Brain; Egger et al. 2021 Stroke), a prerequisite for personalized treatment strategies.

His research has been featured in news outlets such as NZZ, Le Nouvelliste, Physics World, Der Spiegel, and Focus.

Distinctions 

Hummel is the recipient of the 2015 Felgenhauer Symposiums Prize of the German Neurological Society and the Felgenhauer Foundation; the 2013 prize of the German Society of Neurotraumatology and Clinical Neurorehabilitation; the 2010 Dr. Martini Prize; the 2005 Susanne Klein-Vogelbach Prize; 2005 Fellows Award for Research Excellence by the National Institutes of Health; and the 2003 Feodor Lynen Research Fellowship Award by the Alexander von Humboldt Foundation.

He is a member of the German Neurological Society, the Society for Neuroscience, and the Society for the Neural Control of Movement.

Selected works

References

External links 
 
 Website of the Hummel Laboratory

1969 births
Living people
University of Tübingen alumni
University of Bordeaux alumni
Academic staff of the École Polytechnique Fédérale de Lausanne
German neuroscientists
German neurologists